The Auditor General of Sri Lanka (Sinhala: ශ්‍රී ලංකා විගණකාධිපති Śrī Laṃkā viganakādhipathi; Tamil: இலங்கை கணக்காய்வாளர் தலைமை) is appointed by the President to aid accountability by conducting independent audits of government operations. These audits provide members of Parliament with objective information to help them examine the government's activities and hold it to account. According to the constitution, the Auditor General is empowered to audit the accounts of all departments of Government, the Offices of the Cabinet of Ministers, the Judicial Service Commission, the Public Service Commission, the Parliamentary Commissioner for Administration, the Secretary-General of Parliament and the Commissioner of Elections, local authorities, public corporations and business or other undertakings vested in the Government under any written law.

The Auditor General of Sri Lanka is the head of the Auditor General's Department.

List of Auditors General
While the title of Auditor General of Sri Lanka was formally adopted on the country's enactment of its 1978 republican constitution, the position or an equivalent to it has existed since 1799 under various titles. The Department in its current form considers itself a continuation of the office established in 1799, and the table below thus lists all officeholders that have held positions equivalent to the position of the current Auditor General.

See also

 Auditor General

References

External links
 The Auditor-General's Department of Sri Lanka
 THE CONSTITUTION OF THE DEMOCRATIC SOCIALIST REPUBLIC OF SRI LANKA

Sri Lanka

Accounting in Sri Lanka
Accountants general